Several fictional universes exist in science fiction that serve as backstage for novels, short stories, motion pictures and games. This list includes:

 The Alex Benedict universe by Jack McDevitt
 The Alien Legion universe by Carl Potts, Alan Zelenetz, and Frank Cirocco
The Alliance-Union universe by C. J. Cherryh
The Alien Nation universe by Rockne S. O'Bannon
 The Babylon 5 universe, by J. Michael Straczynski
 The BattleTech universe, originally created by Jordan Weisman and Patrick Larkin and fleshed out by a multitude of other authors including Michael A. Stackpole, William H. Keith, Jr., Blaine Lee Pardoe, and Loren L. Coleman
 The Battlestar Galactica universe by Glen A. Larson.
 The Blade Runner universe by Philip K. Dick
 The Bolo universe by Keith Laumer.
 The Chronology of the Future universe by Ian Tataj.
 The CoDominium universe by Jerry Pournelle
 The Culture universe by Iain M. Banks
 The Commonwealth Saga universe by Peter F. Hamilton
 The Compass Arsenal Universe by Daniel Bailey 
 The Dead Space Universe by Glen Schofield and Michael Condrey
 The Whoniverse co-created with Sydney Newman, Verity Lambert, Mervyn Pinfield, Anthony Coburn and C.E. Webber, among others
 The Dune universe by Frank Herbert
 The Terro-Human Future History universe by H. Beam Piper
 The Eight Worlds Universe by John Varley
 The Enderverse by Orson Scott Card
 The EVE Online Universe, New Eden, by CCP Games
 The Familias Regnant universe by Elizabeth Moon
 The Farscape universe by Rockne S. O'Bannon
 The Gaean Reach universe by Jack Vance
 The Gallatin universe by L. Neil Smith
 The Gundam universe by Yoshiyuki Tomino and Sunrise
 The Half-Life universe, by Valve
 The Halo universe, by Bungie and 343 Industries
 The Heritage Universe by Charles Sheffield
 The Heechee universe by Frederik Pohl
 The Honorverse by David Weber
 The Humanx Commonwealth Universe, by Alan Dean Foster
The Hunger Games universe, by Suzanne Collins
 The Hyperion universe by Dan Simmons
 The Independence Day universe by Roland Emmerich and Dean Devlin
 The Instrumentality of Mankind universe, by Cordwainer Smith
 The Isaac's Universe, by Isaac Asimov
 The Known Space universe by Larry Niven
 The Liaden universe by Sharon Lee and Steve Miller
 The Long Earth universe by Terry Pratchett and Stephen Baxter
 The Lost Fleet universe by John G. Hemry
 The Lost in Space universe by Irwin Allen
 The Lunar Chronicles universe, by Marissa Meyer
 The Mass Effect universe, by BioWare
 The Nineteen Eighty-Four Universe, By George Orwell
The Noon Universe, by Arkady and Boris Strugatsky
 The Old Man's War universe, by John Scalzi
 The Orion's Arm universe, by M. Alan Kazlev, Donna Malcolm Hirsekorn, Bernd Helfert and Anders Sandberg 
 The Planet of the Apes universe, by Pierre Boulle
 The Perryverse (Perryversum) of Perry Rhodan
 The Rafał Kosik's universe
 The Red Dwarf universe by Rob Grant and Doug Naylor
 The Revelation Space universe by Alastair Reynolds
 The Rifts Megaverse by Kevin Siembieda
 The Robot–Empire–Foundation universe, by Isaac Asimov
 The Whatever Happened to... Robot Jones? universe, created by Greg Miller
 The Saga of the Skolian Empire universe, by Catherine Asaro
 The Science Adventure universe, created by Chiyomaru Shikura
 The Sector General universe by James White
 The Space: Above and Beyond universe by Glen Morgan and James Wong
 The StarCraft universe, by Blizzard Entertainment
 The Starflight universe, by Binary Systems
 The StarGate universe, by Brad Wright & Jonathan Glassner
 The Starship Troopers universe, by Robert A. Heinlein
 The Star Trek universe, by Gene Roddenberry
 The Star Fleet Universe by Steven V. Cole
 The Traveller universe, by Game Designers' Workshop
 The Titanfall universe, by Respawn Entertainment
 The TekWar universe, by William Shatner 
 The Uplift Universe by David Brin
 The V universe, by Kenneth Johnson
 The X-Files universe by Chris Carter
 The X-Universe by Egosoft
 The Xeelee universe, by Stephen Baxter
 The Zones of Thought universe, by Vernor Vinge

Some universes also include elements from other genres of speculative fiction such as fantasy or horror.
 The Star Wars universe, by George Lucas (space opera with some Tolkien influences ) 
 The Warhammer 40,000 universe by Games Workshop
 Bas-Lag by China Miéville

See also
 List of fictional universes in literature
 Galactic empire
 List of galactic communities

References

Science fiction
Universes